The Party of Sardinians (PdS) is a social-democratic, separatist political party in Sardinia.

History
In July 2012 Franciscu Sedda and Ornella Demuru, husband and wife, left Project Republic of Sardinia (ProgReS), a party they were instrumental to launch, over disagreements with the new party leadership and the rise of Michela Murgia, a writer who was headed to become the party's candidate in the 2014 regional election.

In July 2013 Sedda launched the PdS along with Paolo Maninchedda, a splinter from the Sardinian Action Party (PSd'Az). At the first party congress Sedda declared: "Let's start to think and act as a state and a nation, and self-determination will come, maybe not today, but much sooner than we think". The PdS, which long sought an alliance with the centre-left led by the Democratic Party (PD), was welcomed in the coalition, along with the Red Moors and Independence Republic of Sardinia.

In the regional election, which took place in February 2014, the party won 2.7% of the vote and two regional councillors. In December 2017 Sedda and Maninchedda exchanged leadership roles: the former, who used to be secretary, became president, while the latter, who used to be president, became secretary.

In the 2019 regional election the PdS ran alone with Maninchedda as its candidate for President. They obtained 3.7% and 3.4%, respectively, thus, even though that was an improvement from five years before, the party fell short of entering the Regional Council again as the threshold was at 4% for parties outside coalitions.

Leadership
Secretary: Franciscu Sedda (2013–2017), Paolo Maninchedda (2017–present)
President: Paolo Maninchedda (2013–2017), Franciscu Sedda (2017–present)

References

External links
Official website

Political parties in Sardinia